Emilie de Ravin (born 27 December 1981) is an Australian actress. She starred as Tess Harding on Roswell (2000–2002), Claire Littleton on the ABC drama Lost (2004–2008, 2010), and as Belle on the ABC drama Once Upon a Time (2011–2018).  De Ravin's film credits include Santa's Slay (2005), The Hills Have Eyes (2006) and Ball Don't Lie (2008). She starred as Emily, the heroin-addicted ex-girlfriend of Brendan Frye, in the neo-noir film Brick (2005). She had a cameo in Public Enemies (2009) and starred as Ally in Remember Me (2010).

Early life
De Ravin was born in Mount Eliza, Victoria, Australia, an outer southeastern suburb of Melbourne. She has French ancestry. Having studied ballet since the age of nine at Christa Cameron School of Ballet in Melbourne, and being home schooled by her mother, she was accepted into the Australian Ballet School at fifteen, where she performed in productions with The Australian Ballet as well as Danceworld 301.

She studied acting at Australia's National Institute of Dramatic Art, and with the Prime Time Actors Studio in Los Angeles.

Career
De Ravin's first major role was a recurring part as Curupira in the TV series Beastmaster. She went on to appear as alien/human hybrid Tess Harding in the teen television series, Roswell. She landed this role one month after moving to Los Angeles at the age of 18.

In 2004, De Ravin was cast to portray Claire Littleton on the hit ABC drama Lost. Speaking about the success of Lost, she said: "It's sort of hard to say. You read something and have a good feeling about it, it sounds great, ties nicely together and then shooting something, editing it, the music, the actors involved, everything sort of plays a huge part. Everyone involved had a great feeling towards it, but you never really know." De Ravin was a series regular for the first four seasons and the sixth and final season. She was not a regular in season five but was under a holding contract with ABC Network.

In 2005, De Ravin was cast to portray Emily Kostich, the heroin-addicted ex-girlfriend of Brendan Frye (Joseph Gordon-Levitt), in the neo-noir film Brick. In an interview about the film, Ravin told that she was attracted by the script because it was original and the teens in the film are very deep and emotional for their age.

A year later, De Ravin had a lead role and was cast as Brenda Carter in the remake of The Hills Have Eyes. The film performed well at the box office. In 2007, Variety reported that she would be starring in the film Ball Don't Lie, which premiered at the 2008 Tribeca Film Festival, which arrived in cinemas early 2009. De Ravin appeared in William Dear's The Perfect Game, and appeared in the 2009 film Public Enemies as a bank teller named Barbara Patzke.

De Ravin was cast in the movie adaption of the video game Onimusha, but due to producer Samuel Hadida's other project The Imaginarium of Doctor Parnassus, and star Heath Ledger's death, Hadida was forced to push back the release date of the film. Onimusha is postponed for an unknown amount of time and there is not any confirmation if De Ravin will continue the project. De Ravin filmed Remember Me in the summer of 2009. The film received its wide release on 12 March 2010.

In 2012 she guest-starred as Belle on the ABC fantasy drama, Once Upon a Time. After sporadic appearances in the first season, she was promoted to a series regular in the second. In May 2017, it was announced that De Ravin would be departing the series after six seasons along with her co-stars Ginnifer Goodwin, Josh Dallas, Jared S. Gilmore and Rebecca Mader. Two months later, it was reported that De Ravin would be guest-starring in at least one episode of the series's seventh season. That episode turned out to be the season's fourth, "Beauty". De Ravin also returned as Belle for the series finale, "Leaving Storybrooke".

She was to star as Anthony LaPaglia's character's daughter in the new drama series Americana in 2012, but ABC passed on the pilot. She starred in the 2015 indie film The Submarine Kid.

Other projects 
De Ravin has graced the covers of numerous international fashion magazines, including US' Entertainment Weekly, FHM, InStyle Weddings, 944, Life, Where, LA Baby and Giant; Finland's Demi; Belgium's Ciné Télé Revue; Australia's Sunday and People; and UK's Fabric. She has also modeled for CosmoGirl, Stuff and BPM Culture.  She has appeared in advertising campaigns for JCPenney and Hanes. De Ravin has been included on Maxim's Hot 100 list three times: in 2005 (No. 47), 2006 (No. 65), and 2008 (No. 68).

Personal life

After three years of dating, actor Josh Janowicz proposed to De Ravin on New Year's Day 2003 in Melbourne, which she said "was very impromptu and very sweet". She met Janowicz in Los Angeles, and said that "our life together always comes before work. You can't buy love or family." While filming Lost, De Ravin flew to and from Hawaii "once or twice a week" to return to her home in Burbank, California, which she shared with Janowicz and their poodle.

The couple married 19 June 2003 in Melbourne, Australia. They separated six months after they married, and then reconciled. In June 2009, it was reported that they were living separately and had filed for divorce. In October 2009, she called off the divorce after a trip to Japan with her husband. On 8 July 2014, de Ravin filed for divorce from Janowicz. According to court documents, the pair wed on 19 June 2003, despite their wedding ceremony on 26 June 2006; the documents further confirm that the couple separated on 1 November 2013.

On 3 October 2015, de Ravin announced via Twitter that she was expecting her first child with her boyfriend Eric Bilitch.  In 2016, she gave birth to a daughter. The couple announced their engagement on 6 July 2016.

On 29 June 2018, de Ravin announced her pregnancy with the couple's second child, a son, via social media. He was born in December 2018.

Filmography
Film

Television

Video game

 Lost: Via Domus'' (2008), as Claire Littleton

References

External links

1981 births
20th-century Australian actresses
21st-century Australian actresses
20th-century American actresses
21st-century American actresses
Actresses from Victoria (Australia)
American people of French descent
Australian Ballet School alumni
Australian emigrants to the United States
Australian people of French descent
Australian film actresses
Australian television actresses
American film actresses
American television actresses
Living people
People from Mount Eliza, Victoria
People with acquired American citizenship